Adrian Patrick Barry "Andy" Monahan (3 November 1927 – 11 May 2010) was an Australian rules footballer who played for the Geelong Football Club in the Victorian Football League (VFL).

Notes

External links 

1927 births
2010 deaths
Australian rules footballers from Victoria (Australia)
Geelong Football Club players